Cherokee County Schools or Cherokee County School District may refer to:

 Cherokee County Schools (Alabama)
 Cherokee County Schools (North Carolina)
 Cherokee County School District (Georgia)
 Cherokee County School District (South Carolina)

See also
 Cherokee Independent School District in Cherokee, Texas
 Cherokee Community School District in Iowa
 Cherokee USD 247 in Kansas
 Cherokee Public Schools in Oklahoma